Hay Job Evaluation is a method used by corporations and organizations to map out their job roles in the context of the organizational structure.

Purpose
The general purpose for carrying out job evaluations using this or similar job evaluation methods is to enable organizations to map and align their roles/jobs. This can deliver benefits:

 Clarity in result areas and accountabilities in the processes of the organization
 Enabling salary and benefit grading or benchmarking due to standardization of job levels
 Improved succession planning or mobility within the organization
 Creation of more useful and focused job descriptions

Applying the Hay method to a position results in two profiles being produced which are called long and short profiles. The long profile provides a view on aspects of the role and a score. The short profile refers to the nature of the job (e.g. scientist versus sales manager) and acts as a check on the long profile. 

Typically, Hay evaluations are carried out in a series of steps within any organization which chooses to use the method. Steps to be taken are:

 Training for representatives from major operational departments and HR functions in the use of the method. This will include practical exercises where a mix of people will act as a "job evaluation board" 
 Revision of all job descriptions across the enterprise under HR guidance. Typically a single standard (format) will be required if it is not already in existence. 
 Creation of job evaluation boards – mix of line management, HR and experts to decide on plotting of jobs. 
 Organization map and banding proposal – Typically the HR function will work with senior management to put together a proposal for banding (scales expressed in Hay points) or grading staff and describing the benefits that will be attracted by each band.
 Board review – once the jobs are all rated and the organization map is completed, the company board or equivalent will review the summary, the banding proposals, cost if any, to the company and recommended activities to go live. Assuming these are approved, the overall project manager will then move to implementation.

The Korn Ferry Hay Guide Charts (property of the Korn Ferry Hay Guide Chart-Profile Method) are the central instrument of the proprietary point-factor job evaluation method developed by the Hay Group, now Korn Ferry. The Hay Group was founded in 1943 in Philadelphia, Pennsylvania, by Edward N. Hay.

Dimensions 

In the Guide Charts, the requirements of a job are regarded as universal, and are termed factors, these being sub-divided into "dimensions". 

The three universal factors are said to be: 

 Know-how
 Problem solving
 Accountability

The dimensions within each factor vary.  Typically the dimensions break down as follows:

Know-how
 Practical and technical knowledge
 Planning and organising skills
 Communicating and influencing skills

Problem solving
 Thinking environment
 Thinking challenge

Accountability
 Freedom to act
 Magnitude
 Impact

The power of the Guide Chart lies in the scoring system and relations of the factors (or the Profile.)

Points 

The Hay Guide Chart consists of a points system in which the job scores can be deduced from the chart after job evaluation in terms of factors, dimensions and gradation. 

The point system uses geometric progression and is not linear.  This preserves the integrity of the system at all ends of the grading spectrum. The numbering pattern/geometric progression means that each number on the scale has the same (proportional) relationship to the previous one.

Criticisms 

A criticism levelled against the Hay Guide Chart is that the choice of factors is skewed towards traditional management values:
"The Hay system consistently values male-dominated management functions over non-management functions more likely to be performed by women.”

The Hay system does not account for the availability of alternative resources in the market. A carpenter may be classified as a low scale occupation, but if there are none available the method will not account for that.

In the EU, using a job evaluation scheme can provide a material factor defence for equal pay claims, but care must be taken to ensure that the scheme itself cannot be said to have a gender bias.

References 

Job evaluation